= Karl Grammann =

German composer (1842–1897)

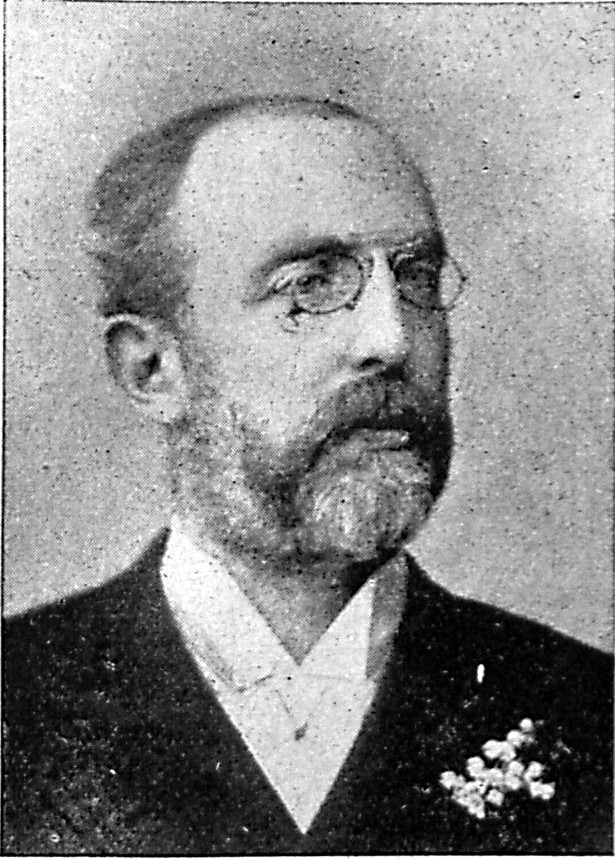
Karl Grammann

Karl Grammann (June 3, 1844 - January 30, 1897) was a German composer. A native of Lübeck, he died in Dresden. His output included eight operas, two symphonies, a violin concerto, other orchestral works, piano music, and songs. Among his operas are Ingrid, to a libretto by T. Kersten; Irrlicht, to a libretto by Kurt Geucke; and Melusine, premiered in 1874 and revised for performances in Dresden in 1891.
